The Best of Judas Priest is a compilation album featuring select songs from English heavy metal band Judas Priest's first two albums, Rocka Rolla (1974) and Sad Wings of Destiny (1976).

Overview
After forming in 1969, Judas Priest signed with Gull Records in 1974. When the band jumped to CBS Records in early 1977, they had to break their contract with Gull to do so. In the legal fallout that ensued, the band forfeited their rights to all material recorded with Gull.

The album is not a typical "greatest hits" type of collection as the title would imply. It was the first of a handful of releases featuring material Judas Priest had recorded during their time with Gull, and was produced by the label in an effort to capitalize on the band's growing popularity. As the band had forfeited their legal claim to the music, the album was released without their consent.

Track listing

Original LP release 

All songs originally from Rocka Rolla (1974), except Diamonds & Rust, which was an outtake from the Sad Wings of Destiny sessions and was included to generate more interest on the compilation.

All songs originally released on Sad Wings of Destiny (1976).
§ - at least on certain releases both on vinyl and CD the track is featured in a different mix from its original 1976 version. An example can be found on the 1989 CD release on Possum Records from Australia.

1987 CD release

2001 CD release 
This release contains, according to Judas Priest's website, a "mindless interview" from former drummer John Hinch, who was let go from the band because he was "musically inadequate". They have described it as "not only misleading but full of rubbish and false information". In a 1998 interview with Goldmine Magazine, Tipton commented on the reason the company bothered to release the album:

"We believe that they're abusing the kids with...The Best Of Judas Priest and the re-packaging. It's not fair for us to condone them, because it's ripping the kids off. On the "Insight Series" CD, they include bullshit interviews with our first drummer John Hinch, who couldn't even play the drums, believe you me. But it's tracked to look like new songs. We don't get royalties off it, but the kids think we do."

Personnel 
 Rob Halford – lead vocals, harmonica
 K.K. Downing – guitar
 Glenn Tipton – guitar, backing vocals
 Ian Hill – bass
 John Hinch – drums
 Alan Moore – drums

References 

Judas Priest compilation albums
1978 greatest hits albums